The Diocese of Willochra is a diocese of the Anglican Church of Australia. It is situated in the  northern and western parts of the state of South Australia, Australia. As part of the Province of South Australia it covers the Eyre Peninsula, Yorke Peninsula and the towns of Coober Pedy, Port Augusta and Minlaton. The diocesan cathedral is Saints Peter and Paul Cathedral in Port Pirie. The diocese was founded in 1915, with Gilbert White installed as the first bishop. On 29 October 2022, the diocese elected Jeremy James, currently assistant bishop in the Anglican Diocese of Perth, as its next bishop;, replacing John Stead who retired on 2 July 2022. James was installed on 25 February 2023.

History
The diocese covers over 90% of the state, mainly in northern and western South Australia. The diocese is made up of thirteen parishes and five ministry districts comprising 80 small congregations. It was created from the Diocese of Adelaide in 1915.

Cathedral

The cathedral church of the diocese is the Cathedral of Ss Peter and Paul in Port Pirie. The cathedral building was built in 1899 as a parish church and was consecrated as cathedral on 29 June 1999.

The building is constructed of dressed stone and corrugated iron roof and is furnished internally in minimalist but slightly high church style.

Bishops of Willochra

Deans of Willochra

 1999–2006: Peter Garland
 2010–2015: David Amery
 2016–2020: Mary Lewis 
 2021–present: Mark Hawkes

References

External links
 Diocese of Willochra website

Willochra
Anglican bishops of Willochra
1915 establishments in Australia
Anglican Church of Australia Ecclesiastical Province of South Australia